Robert F. Kelly (born June 17, 1935) is a senior United States district judge of the United States District Court for the Eastern District of Pennsylvania.

Education and career

Born in Rosemont, Pennsylvania, Kelly received a Bachelor of Science degree from Villanova University in 1957 and a Bachelor of Laws from Temple University School of Law in 1960. He was in private practice in Media, Pennsylvania from 1961 to 1962. He was in private practice in Chester, Pennsylvania from 1962 to 1964. He was in private practice in Media from 1964 to 1976. He was a Clerk for Judge Francis J. Catania of the Court of Common Pleas of Delaware County, Pennsylvania from 1964 to 1972. He was the Prothonotary of Delaware County from 1972 to 1976. He was the Chairman of the Delaware County Republican Executive Committee from 1972 to 1985. He was a judge on the Court of Common Pleas of the 32nd Judicial District of Pennsylvania from 1976 to 1987.

Federal judicial service

Kelly was nominated by President Ronald Reagan on May 1, 1987, to a seat on the United States District Court for the Eastern District of Pennsylvania vacated by Judge Donald West VanArtsdalen. He was confirmed by the United States Senate on June 25, 1987, and received his commission on June 26, 1987. He assumed senior status on July 17, 2001.

References

Sources
 

1935 births
Living people
Judges of the United States District Court for the Eastern District of Pennsylvania
United States district court judges appointed by Ronald Reagan
20th-century American judges
Villanova University alumni
Temple University Beasley School of Law alumni
21st-century American judges